Lapaeumides is a genus of moths within the family Castniidae.

Species
Lapaeumides actor (Dalman, 1824)
Lapaeumides ctesiphon (Hübner, [1820])
Lapaeumides zerynthia (Gray, 1838)

References

Castniidae